William Dunne was an Irish Roman Catholic priest who served as first bishop for the Diocese of Kitui, Kenya. 

He was born in Devlin, Ireland, in 1920. Dunne joined the Kiltegan Fathers and was ordained a priest in 1944. Dunne arrived in Kenya in 1951
when the Kiltegan Fathers took over Kitui from the Holy Ghost Fathers. He became Prefect Apostolic of Kitui in 1956.
Dunne was ordained the first Bishop of Kitui in 1964. 

Retiring at the age of 75 in 1995, he was succeeded by Boniface Lele as bishop.  Dunne died in Nairobi Hospital on 31 March 2002.

References

1920 births
2002 deaths
20th-century Irish Roman Catholic priests
Irish expatriates in Kenya
Roman Catholic missionaries in Kenya
20th-century Roman Catholic bishops in Kenya
Irish expatriate Catholic bishops
Roman Catholic bishops of Kitui